Colonel Kwiatkowski  is a Polish comedy-drama film directed by Kazimierz Kutz. It was released in 1996.

Plot 
Just after the end of the World War 2, Kwiatkowski, a military physician, finds himself in a quarrel with a Soviet officer. To avoid escalation, he pretends that he is a high-ranking UB official. After getting away with it, he is asked by a mother of an AK fighter to help her son from becoming a political prisoner. Kwiatkowski frees the young man by pretending to make an inspection of the facility he is jailed in. The fake officer decides to use the post-war confusion and lawlessness to liberate several other political prisoners.

References

External links
 

1996 films
Polish comedy-drama films
1990s Polish-language films
1996 comedy-drama films